The 1982 Five Nations Championship was the fifty-third series of the rugby union Five Nations Championship. Including the previous incarnations as the Home Nations and Five Nations, this was the eighty-eighth series of the northern hemisphere rugby union championship. Ten matches were played between 16 January and 20 March. The winner of the championship was Ireland, with three wins and one defeat. It was the team's ninth title (excluding seven previous other titles which were shared). Ireland also won the Triple Crown, its fifth such honour, its first since 1949 and last one until 1985. The team's only defeat came on the final day of the competition, losing 22-9 to France in Paris, denying the Irish what would have been only their second ever Grand Slam.

Wales's defeat by Scotland was their first loss at home in a Five Nations championship match since France won at Cardiff in March 1968.

The Ireland vs Wales game was delayed by a week due to a frozen pitch in Dublin.

Participants
The teams involved were:

Table

Squads

Results

References
1982 Five Nations results

External links

The official RBS Six Nations Site

Six Nations Championship seasons
Five Nations
Five Nations
Five Nations
Five Nations
Five Nations
Five Nations
 
Five Nations
Five Nations
Five Nations